Peter Vincent Scamurra (born February 23, 1955) is an American former professional ice hockey defenseman who played for the Washington Capitals for parts of four seasons in 1975–1980. He was drafted 19th overall in 1975 by the Capitals and 50th overall by the Cleveland Crusaders of the World Hockey Association.

Hockey career

Early career 
Scamurra was born in Buffalo, New York and raised in Williamsville, New York. He started playing ice hockey in fifth grade while attending Nichols School. He attended high school at Amherst Central High School and captured the Erie County Interscholastic Conference first singles tennis title, while ranked as a top-ten tennis player in the area.

Junior Hockey 
During his senior year of high school Scamurra played hockey for the Niagara Falls Flyers in the Southern Ontario Junior A Hockey League. There, he was scouted by Bob Johnson, then the coach at the Wisconsin Badgers Ice Hockey Team, which had just won the 1973 NCAA National Championship. Scamurra played 13 games for the University of Wisconsin in 1973-74 as a left winger, when he was offered a contract by Roger Neilson, then head coach of the Peterborough Petes of the Ontario Hockey Association to play defense. He played the final 35 games for the Petes in 1973-74, who were runners-up for the J. Ross Robertson Cup.

Team Canada was represented by the Peterborough Petes in the inaugural 1974 World Junior Ice Hockey Championships, and Scamurra played for the team, despite being American. He scored one goal in the tournament, and Canada finished with the bronze medal.

Scamurra played for the Petes again in 1974-75, leading defensemen in goals, and finishing with 52 points in 62 games.

Professional Hockey 
Scamurra was selected 19th overall by the Washington Capitals in the 1975 NHL Draft, as the highest American taken in the draft. At the time he was the first player drafted in the NHL from the Buffalo area, and remained the highest selected from the region until Pat Kane was selected first overall in the 2007 NHL Draft.

He was invited to a tryout for Team USA in the 1976 Canada Cup but did not make the final team.

Scamurra played in parts of four seasons for the Capitals between 1974 and 1980, but was often sidelined, having four knee surgeries throughout his career. He briefly played in the SM-liiga, playing 16 games for SaiPa in 1980-81.

Personal life 
Scamurra's daughter, Hayley Scamurra, is a professional ice hockey player currently playing for the Buffalo Beauts of the NWHL.

References

External links

Profile at hockeydraftcentral.com

1955 births
American men's ice hockey defensemen
Binghamton Dusters players
Binghamton Whalers players
Cleveland Crusaders draft picks
Living people
People from Williamsville, New York
Wisconsin Badgers men's ice hockey players
Peterborough Petes (ice hockey) players
SaiPa players
Springfield Indians players
Washington Capitals draft picks
Washington Capitals players
Ice hockey players from New York (state)
Amherst Central High School Alumni